TLU may mean:

Computing
 Tape Library Unit, an individual computer storage tape library
 Threshold Logical Unit in neural networks

Universities
 Tallinn University
 Texas Lutheran University
 "The Lords University", a jocular acronym referring to BYU, Brigham Young University

Transportation
 Golfo de Morrosquillo Airport (IATA airport code: TLU; ICAO airport code: SKTL) in Tolú, Sucre, Colombia
 Aero Toluca Internactional (ICAO airline code: TLU), see List of airline codes (A)
 The London Underground, the subway of London, England, UK

Other uses
 The Last of Us (series), a video game series and media franchise
 The Last of Us (2013 videogame) first game in the series
 Tulehu language (ISO 639 language code: tlu)
 St. Kitts and Nevis Trades and Labour Union
 Tropical Livestock Unit